Inverness was a burgh constituency that elected one commissioner to the Parliament of Scotland and to the Convention of Estates.

After the Acts of Union 1707, Inverness, Forres, Fortrose and Nairn formed the Inverness district of burghs, returning one member between them to the House of Commons of Great Britain.

List of burgh commissioners

 1661–63, 1678 convention: Alexander Cuthbert, provost 
1665 convention: not represented
 1667 convention:Robert Barbour 
 1669–74: Fraser Finlay, bailie 
 1681–82: William Duff, bailie 
 1685–86, 1689 convention, 1689–1701: John Cuthbert of Drakies, merchant, provost 
 1702–07: Alexander Duff of Drumure

See also
 List of constituencies in the Parliament of Scotland at the time of the Union

References

Politics of the county of Inverness
History of the Scottish Highlands
Burghs represented in the Parliament of Scotland (to 1707)
Constituencies disestablished in 1707
1707 disestablishments in Scotland